Stephen Andrews was Anglican Bishop of Algoma from 2008 to 2016.

Early life and education 
He studied classics at the University of Colorado and theology at Regent College and Wycliffe College, gaining an M.Div. degree in 1984. After spending two years in London as a study assistant to John Stott, he was ordained in the Diocese of Nova Scotia in 1986. In 2016 Andrews was  awarded an honorary Doctorate of Sacred Theology by Thorneloe University in Sudbury, Ontario. In 2010 Bishop Andrews was awarded an honorary Doctorate of Divinity by Wycliffe College.

Andrews is married with two daughters.

Ordained ministry 
He then served as assistant curate at St Paul's, Halifax until 1990 and in 1994 was appointed rector of The Cathedral Church of St. Alban the Martyr in Prince Albert, Saskatchewan and Dean of Saskatchewan, serving in those roles until 2001.

In 2001 he was appointed president, vice chancellor and provost of Thorneloe University, working in that capacity until his consecration as bishop of Algoma in 2008.  He left the Diocese of Algoma to become principal of Wycliffe College, Toronto in August 2016.

References

21st-century Anglican Church of Canada bishops
Academic staff of Laurentian University
Anglican bishops of Algoma
Living people
Year of birth missing (living people)
Anglican Church of Canada deans